Lad or lads may refer to:

 A boy or young man
 Lad culture, a British subculture

Arts and entertainment
 Lad (video game), 2012 iOS game
 Lad, A Dog, a collection of short stories by Albert Payson Terhune
 The Lads, a New Zealand Christian rock-pop band

Organizations
 Light Aid Detachment, a subunit of the Royal Electrical and Mechanical Engineers or Royal Canadian Electrical and Mechanical Engineers
 Los Angeles Dodgers, a Californian baseball team, which played in Brooklyn prior to 1958
 Latin America Division, a unit in some international organisations
 Lycée Alexandre Dumas
 Swiss Laboratory for Doping Analyses (Laboratoire suisse d'analyse du dopage)

Places
 Ląd, Greater Poland Voivodeship, Poland
 Lad, Hungary, a village
 Lad, Bhiwani, Haryana, India

Science and medicine
 Language acquisition device, part of the human brain structure as proposed by Noam Chomsky
 Leukocyte adhesion deficiency
 Left anterior descending, an alternate name for the anterior interventricular branch of left coronary artery
 Left axis deviation
 Locally advanced disease, a stage in the progression of cancer
 Lymphadenopathy
 Lysergic acid diethylamide

Transportation
 Ladywell railway station (National rail station code: LAD), in Ladywell, London
 Quatro de Fevereiro Airport (IATA code: LAD), in Luanda, Angola

Others
 LAD (military), Lithuanian Auxiliary Police Battalions
 Judaeo-Spanish (ISO 639 alpha-2: lad)
 Least absolute deviations, a mathematical optimization technique
 Land assembly district, a proposed legal regime for assembling land
 Local Address Data, a concept in digital electronics
 Laboratory aim density, see China girl (filmmaking)
 Lamina-associating domains, regions of the chromosome that interact with the nuclear lamina; see

See also
Ladd (disambiguation)